James Michael Lambert (born November 18, 1994) is an American professional baseball pitcher for the Chicago White Sox of Major League Baseball (MLB).

Amateur career
Lambert attended San Dimas High School in San Dimas, California. As a senior, he compiled a 13-1 record with a 1.18 ERA, striking out 80 batters in 94 innings. He was not drafted out of high school in the 2013 MLB draft and enrolled at Fresno State University where he played college baseball for the Fresno State Bulldogs. As a sophomore at Fresno State in 2015, he posted a 4-2 record and a 4.66 ERA in 17 games (13 starts). In 2016, as a junior at Fresno State, he was named the Mountain West Conference Co-Pitcher of the Year (alongside Griffin Jax) after compiling an 8-0 record and a 2.65 ERA in ten conference starts. He finished with an overall record of 10-2 with a 3.13 ERA over 15 games as a starter. After his junior year, he was selected by the Chicago White Sox in the fifth round of the 2016 MLB draft and he signed for $325,000.

Professional career
After signing, Lambert made his professional debut with the AZL White Sox, and he was promoted to the Kannapolis Intimidators during the season. In 15 games (13 starts) between the two clubs, he was 1-6 with a 5.26 ERA. Lambert began 2017 with Kannapolis, and after going 7-2 with a 2.19 ERA in 12 starts, earning him a South Atlantic League All Star selection, he was promoted to the Winston-Salem Dash in June. He finished the season with Winston-Salem, pitching to a 5-4 record with a 5.45 ERA in 14 starts. In 2018, he began the year with Winston-Salem, and after going 5-7 with a 3.95 ERA in 13 starts, he was promoted to the Birmingham Barons. In five starts for Birmingham, he was 3-1 with a 2.88 ERA. He returned to Birmingham in 2019, going 3-4 with a 4.55 ERA over 11 starts.

Lambert was added to the White Sox 40–man roster following the 2019 season.

Lambert made his MLB debut on July 25, 2020 against the Minnesota Twins at Guaranteed Rate Field. He successfully got 3 outs in the 9th inning and closed out the win for the Sox. Lambert would only appear in one more game after his debut as he missed the rest of the season with a right forearm strain.

Personal life
Lambert's brother is Peter Lambert, who is also a professional baseball player and currently pitches for the Colorado Rockies.

References

External links

1994 births
Living people
People from Arcadia, California
Baseball players from California
Major League Baseball pitchers
Chicago White Sox players
Fresno State Bulldogs baseball players
Arizona League White Sox players
Kannapolis Intimidators players
Winston-Salem Dash players
Birmingham Barons players